"Hurts 2B Human" is a song recorded by American singer Pink for her eighth studio album, Hurts 2B Human (2019). The track was initially released on April 22, 2019 as the third and final promotional single but later sent to radio in Australia and The Netherlands on August 30, 2019 as the album's third single. "Hurts 2B Human" was written by Pink, Teddy Geiger, Anna Catherine-Hartley, Alexander Izquierdo,  Scott Harris & Khalid Robinson, while the production was handled by Odegard.

Release
The official lyric video of "Hurts 2B Human" was released on April 22, 2019.

Track listing
Remixes
"Hurts 2B Human" (Midnight Kids remix) – 4:15
"Hurts 2B Human" (Kat Krazy remix) – 2:37
"Hurts 2B Human" (Alex Ghenea remix) – 3:09
"Hurts 2B Human" (FTampa remix) – 2:58
"Hurts 2B Human" (Frank Pole remix) – 3:10

Charts

Certifications

Release history

References

 

2019 songs
2019 singles
Pink (singer) songs
Khalid (singer) songs
Songs written by Pink (singer)
Songs written by Khalid (singer)
Songs written by Teddy Geiger
Songs written by Eskeerdo
Songs written by Scott Harris (songwriter)